Arakkal Beevi refers to the female ruler of Arakkal Kingdom in Kerala, South India.

The Arakkal family followed a matriarchal system of descent: the eldest member of the family, whether male or female, became its head and ruler. While male rulers were called Ali Rajah, female rulers were known as Arakkal Beevis.

Sultana Aysha Aliraja was the ruler until her death on the morning of 27 September 2006.

Cultural depictions
 Ayesha Ali Raja (played by Genelia D'Souza) appears as a character in a Malayalam film titled Urumi. The film is based on a fictional story about a young Indian who tries to assassinate Portuguese explorer, Vasco da Gama. The movie was released on 31 March 2011. But the Arakkal Ayesha played by Genelia D'Souza is different from Aysha Aliraja.

References

History of Kerala